Defending champion Rafael Nadal defeated Roger Federer in the final, 6–2, 6–7(2–7), 6–3, 7–6(7–5) to win the singles tennis title at the 2006 Monte Carlo Masters.

This tournament marked the first professional-level match played between Novak Djokovic and Federer, who would go on to play a total of 50 ATP Tour-level matches against each other; Federer won their first-round encounter.

Seeds

Draw

Finals

Top half

Section 1

Section 2

Bottom half

Section 3

Section 4

External links
 2006 Monte Carlo Masters draw
 2006 Monte Carlo Masters Qualifying draw

Singles